The 2015 FIBA Oceania Championship for Women will be the 16th edition of the basketball tournament. In 2015 it took the form of a two-game series between the Australian Opals and New Zealand Tall Ferns.  It served as the qualifying tournament of FIBA Oceania for basketball at the 2016 Summer Olympics in Rio de Janeiro. The first game was in Melbourne, Australia, on 15 August, the second in Tauranga, New Zealand, on 17 August. The Australian Opals won both games, and qualified for the Olympics, while the losing Tall Ferns qualified for the 2016 FIBA World Olympic Qualifying Tournament for Women, the final qualifying tournament for the 2016 Olympics.

Venues

Results

|}

Game 1
All times are local (UTC+10)

Game 2
All times are local (UTC+12).

Rosters

|}
| style="vertical-align:top;" |
 Head coach
 Brendan Joyce
 Assistant coach(es)
 Scott Richard Butler
 Lori Chizik
 Damian Cotter

Legend
Club – describes lastclub before the tournament
Age – describes ageon 15 August 2015
|}

|}
| valign="top" |
 Head coach
 
 Assistant coaches
 
 

Legend
(C) Team captain
Club – describes lastclub before the tournament
Age – describes ageon 15 August 2015
|}
Source:

Final rankings

References

2015
2015 in women's basketball
2015 in New Zealand basketball
Women
2014–15 in Australian basketball
International women's basketball competitions hosted by Australia
International basketball competitions hosted by New Zealand
Australia women's national basketball team games
New Zealand women's national basketball team games
2015 in Australian women's sport
basketball
August 2015 sports events in Oceania